A list of books and essays about Martin Scorsese:

Scorsese, Martin
Filmography